Adrijanci is a village in the Municipality of Gornji Petrovci in the Prekmurje region of Slovenia.

There is a small chapel in the village built at the beginning of the 20th century. It is used as a funeral home and the original hearse is preserved inside the building. It has a three-storey belfry.

References

External links 
Adrijanci on Geopedia

Populated places in the Municipality of Gornji Petrovci